Humberto Blasco was the Paraguayan Minister of Justice and Labor under President Fernando Lugo.

References

Justice ministers of Paraguay
Living people
Year of birth missing (living people)
Place of birth missing (living people)
21st-century Paraguayan politicians